The  is a tilting diesel multiple unit (DMU) train type operated by Shikoku Railway Company (JR Shikoku) and Tosa Kuroshio Railway on limited express services in Shikoku, Japan.

Design
The design is based on the 2600 series and features a red, gold, and green color scheme, described as "Neo Japonism".

Formation
2700 series sets consist of two or three cars, and are formed as follows. There are 12 first class seats in the series 2800 cars.

Two-car sets

Three-car sets

Interior
The interior features reclining seats with power sockets, a wheelchair space and an accessible toilet. LED lighting is used in order to reduce power consumption.

Technical specifications
The trains have stainless-steel car bodies, and are powered by two SA6D140HE-2 diesel motors. Instead of the pneumatic-spring suspensions of the 2600 series, the 2700 series use pneumatic pendular suspensions, allowing active tilt up to 5°.

History
40 cars were ordered from Kawasaki Heavy Industries as a replacement for ageing 2000 series Trans-Shikoku Express units. The first set was unveiled on January 23, 2019. Entry into revenue service was scheduled for the fall of 2019. The trains entered service on August 6, 2019. The 2700 series was the recipient of the 2020 Laurel Prize.

Operations 
As of 2021, 2700 series trains are used on the following services:

 Ashizuri (Kōchi - Sukumo)
 Nanpū (Okayama - Kōchi)
 Shimanto (Takamatsu - Kōchi - Sukumo)
 Uzushio (Okayama - Takamatsu - Tokushima)

See also
JR Shikoku 2600 series

References

2700 series
2700 series
Tilting trains
Train-related introductions in 2019
Kawasaki multiple units